Lucien Haime is a former boxer from Suriname, who competed in the welterweight (67 kg) division at the 1975 Pan American Games in Mexico City. Haime lost his opening bout to Kenny Bristol of Guyana by knockout in the second round.

References

20th-century births
Living people
Welterweight boxers
Boxers at the 1975 Pan American Games
Pan American Games competitors for Suriname
Surinamese male boxers
Year of birth missing (living people)